The Hoyt Street station is a local station on the IRT Eastern Parkway Line of the New York City Subway in Downtown Brooklyn, served by the 2 train at all times and 3 train at all times except late nights.

History 
Originally built as Hoyt Street–Bridge Street, the station was one of three built on May 1, 1908 as part of an extension of the original IRT Subway beyond Borough Hall. Service increased in 1919 after the Clark Street Tunnel connected the Brooklyn Branch of the IRT Broadway–Seventh Avenue Line into the station. On February 2, 1948, the platform extensions at this station opened, allowing 10-car express trains to board as opposed to only 6-car trains. The platform extensions were part of a program to lengthen the platforms at 32 of the original IRT station for $12.27 million. The Hoyt Street project cost $750,000.

In 1981, the MTA listed the station among the 69 most deteriorated stations in the subway system. In 1982, the Urban Mass Transportation Administration gave a $66 million grant to the New York City Transit Authority. Part of the grant was to be used for the renovation of several subway stations, including Hoyt Street. The station was renovated around the 1980s. 

In 1995, as a result of service reductions, the MTA was considering permanently closing the Hoyt Street station, as well as two or three other stations citywide, due to its proximity to other stations.

Station layout

Hoyt Street is the northernmost four-track station on this line. It is located under the intersection of Fulton Street, Hoyt Street, and Bridge Street. It has two side platforms serving only the local tracks. Trains from the Clark Street Tunnel run on the local tracks and those from the Joralemon Street Tunnel run on the express tracks. The original construction included only the Joralemon Street Tunnel with crossover switches north of Hoyt Street. These switches have been removed and new ones were installed between Nevins Street and Atlantic Avenue, so trains from the Joralemon Street Tunnel cannot stop at this station at all.

South of Borough Hall, the IRT Lexington Avenue Line and the Brooklyn Branch of the IRT Broadway–Seventh Avenue Line join to form the four-track IRT Eastern Parkway Line. Southbound (east Brooklyn-bound) trains use track E1 while northbound (Manhattan-bound) trains use track E4. Southbound and northbound express trains use tracks E2 and E3, respectively. Track numbers and letters are used for chaining purposes and are rarely, if ever, used by passengers.

The station has been extensively renovated; old signs reading "Hoyt Street – Bridge Street" remain on the I-beams separating the local and express tracks. One of the original ceramic cartouches from the station is now on display at the New York Transit Museum.

Exits
All fare control areas are on the respective platforms. The full-time fare control is at the west end of the station, and contains one token booth and a turnstile bank for each platform. The northbound platform has two exits, one to either northern corner of Bridge and Fulton Streets. The southbound platform has a single exit to the southwest corner of Hoyt and Fulton Streets.

There is a part-time fare control area at the extreme eastern ends of both platforms. There are HEET turnstiles on both platforms. The southbound platform's exit leads to the southwest corner of Fulton Street and Elm Place, and the northbound platform's exit leads to the northeast corner of Duffield and Fulton Streets. The northbound platform's part-time fare control area also had an exit-only stair to the northwest corner of Duffield and Fulton Streets, but it was closed due to security concerns.

At the north end of the southbound platform is a closed entrance to Macy's (formerly Abraham & Straus) that included a crossunder to the northbound platform.

References

Further reading

External links 

 

IRT Eastern Parkway Line stations
New York City Subway stations in Brooklyn
Railway stations in the United States opened in 1908
1908 establishments in New York City
Downtown Brooklyn